Sorath may refer to:

 Saurashtra (region), also known as Sorath, a region of Gujarat, India
 Sorath (raga), a raga in Indian music
 Sorath Rai Diyach, a historical romantic tale from Sindh, Pakistan
 Sorath (Shakugan no Shana), a character in the light novel series Shakugan no Shana
 Sorath, a small Australian development team that produced Devil Daggers and Hyper Demon

See also
 Saurashtra (disambiguation)